Fred Otto (4 December 1883 – 22 September 1944) was a German architect. His work was part of the architecture event in the art competition at the 1936 Summer Olympics.

References

1883 births
1944 deaths
20th-century German architects
Olympic competitors in art competitions
People from Sächsische Schweiz-Osterzgebirge